In enzymology, a 2-aminoadipate transaminase is an enzyme that catalyzes the chemical reaction

L-2-aminoadipate + 2-oxoglutarate  2-oxoadipate + L-glutamate

Thus, the two substrates of this enzyme are L-2-aminoadipate and 2-oxoglutarate, whereas its two products are 2-oxoadipate and L-glutamate.

This enzyme belongs to the family of transferases, specifically the transaminases, which transfer nitrogenous groups.  The systematic name of this enzyme class is L-2-aminoadipate:2-oxoglutarate aminotransferase. Other names in common use include alpha-aminoadipate aminotransferase, 2-aminoadipate aminotransferase, 2-aminoadipic aminotransferase, glutamic-ketoadipic transaminase, and glutamate-alpha-ketoadipate transaminase.  This enzyme participates in lysine biosynthesis and lysine degradation.  It employs one cofactor, pyridoxal phosphate.

Structural studies

As of late 2007, only one structure has been solved for this class of enzymes, with the PDB accession code .

References

 

EC 2.6.1
Pyridoxal phosphate enzymes
Enzymes of known structure